Lophocolea bidentata is a species of liverwort belonging to the family Lophocoleaceae.

A study in tropical Ecuador found that Lophocolea bidentata was typically not found in urban environments despite being found in a nearby pristine location, suggesting that the species is sensitive to anthropogenic effects such as the presence of wastewater and heavy metal pollution.

References

Jungermanniales
Flora of Ecuador